The team's flagship station is WBIG-FM (Big 100.3), having been selected as the team's broadcast partner after following a partnership with iHeartMedia in 2022. The team's previous longtime broadcast home was previously WTEM, by virtue of previously being owned by Red Zebra Broadcasting, a group co-owned by Snyder.

References

Washington Commanders
Broadcasters